Peyto Lake is a glacier-fed lake in Banff National Park in the Canadian Rockies. The lake itself is near the Icefields Parkway. It was named for Bill Peyto, an early trail guide and trapper in the Banff area.

During the summer, significant amounts of glacial rock flour flow into the lake from a nearby glacier, and these suspended rock particles are what give the lake a bright, turquoise colour. Because of its bright colour, photos of the lake often appear in illustrated books, and the area around the lake is a popular sightseeing spot. In 2021, Parks Canada completed improvements to the lake viewpoint, trails, and parking areas. The lake is best seen from Bow Summit, the highest point on the Icefields Parkway.

The lake is fed by Peyto Creek, which drains water from Caldron Lake and Peyto Glacier (part of the Wapta Icefield). Peyto Lake is the origin of the Mistaya River, which heads northwest from the lake's outflow.

References

External links

Banff National Park
Lakes of Alberta
Glacial lakes of Canada